Čelopek is a village in the municipality of Brvenica, North Macedonia.

History
According to the 1467-68 Ottoman defter, Čelopek appears as being largely inhabited by an Orthodox Christian Albanian population. Some families had a mixed Slav-Albanian anthroponomy - usually a Slavic first name and an Albanian last name or last names with Albanian patronyms and Slavic suffixes.

The names are: Marko, son of Arbnas; Stanisha, son of Arbnas; Dralla, son of Trajko; Nicholas, his brother; Bogdan, son of Dono; Andre Protogjer; Rala, son of Marin; Rala, son of Pren-çe; Nik-o, son of Dushman; Prusha, son of Petrush; Hamza, son of Gjin; Martin Arbanas; Dimitri, son-in-law of Martin; Kojcin, Jorgji's son-in-law; Nikolla, son of Dushman; Ugrin, son of Kologjer; Rada, son of Gjuka-le; Nik-o, son of Dushman; Ugrin, son of Bojk-o-s; widow Donika; widow Pronka; widow Nika; the widow of Andre.

Demographics

As of the 2021 census, Čelopek had 4,459 residents with the following ethnic composition:
Albanians 3,898
Macedonians 395
Persons for whom data are taken from administrative sources 157
Others 9

According to the 2002 census, the village had a total of 5,287 inhabitants. Ethnic groups in the village included:

Albanians – 4,803 
Macedonians – 463
Turks – 2
Serbs – 1
Others – 18

References

Notable citizens
Ljube Boškoski - former Minister of Internal Affairs of the Republic of Macedonia
Nastoski Gavro-member of MRO and courier of Pitu Guli's guard

External links

Villages in Brvenica Municipality
Albanian communities in North Macedonia